Sándor Kaló (16 March 1944 – 28 January 2020) was a Hungarian handball player and coach. He was born in Egyek.

He represented Hungary in the 1967 World Championship where he finished in eighth place. Three years later he participated in the next World Championship with the same results. In 1972 he played six games and scored 14 goals on the Olympic Games, helping his team to reach again the eighth place.

Awards
 Hungarian Handballer of the Year: 1967, 1978
 Nemzeti Bajnokság I Top Scorer: 1967, 1969

References

1945 births
2020 deaths
People from Egyek
Hungarian male handball players
Hungarian handball coaches
Olympic handball players of Hungary
Handball players at the 1972 Summer Olympics
Sportspeople from Hajdú-Bihar County